Robert Thomson Young (1886–1955) was a Scottish footballer who played as a centre back in the Scottish League for St. Mirren. He moved to England in 1907, signing for Southern League side West Ham United. He later played for Middlesbrough, Everton, and Wolverhampton Wanderers.

References

1886 births
Scottish footballers
Association football central defenders
1955 deaths
Place of death missing
St Mirren F.C. players
West Ham United F.C. players
Middlesbrough F.C. players
Everton F.C. players
Wolverhampton Wanderers F.C. players
People from Stonehouse, South Lanarkshire